Janet Denison Howell (born May 7, 1944 in Washington, D.C.) is an American politician. A Democrat, she was elected to the Senate of Virginia in 1991, where she represents the 32nd district in Fairfax County and portions of Arlington, County.

Biography
She was born to Edward Fulton and Elsie (Lightbown) Denison. Her father was a prominent economist at the U. S. Department of Commerce and the Brookings Institution, and fellow Oberlin alumnus.

Howell taught in the Philadelphia school district, 1968–1969, and was a legislative assistant in the Virginia State Senate from 1989 to 1991.

The Reston Times named her Restonian of the year in 1984. In 1991 the Virginia Association of Social Workers honored her as Virginian of the year. She was named Senator of the Year (Fraternal Order of Police, 1998), Citizen of Yr. (ARC, 1998). She was Chairman of the Fairfax County, Virginia Social Services Board, 1979–82, State Bd. Social Svcs., Va., 1986–91, Reston (Va.) Transp. Com., 1986–91; pres. Reston Community Assn., 1982–85, Citizen of Yr., 1990.

Howell reported financial assets in 2010 worth more than $US1.48 million and possibly more than 
$6 million.

Electoral history

Summary

2011 election campaign
Janet Howell ran for reelection in Virginia's November 8, 2011 election.  The Virginia General Assembly drew new legislative districts to reflect the U.S. Census of 2010. As chairman of the Senate of Virginia's committee on privileges and elections, Mrs. Howell led the process to draw new Senate district boundaries, and she did so to preserve her party's majority and to improve her own reelection prospects within the law. If the U.S. Department of Justice or U.S. District Court for the District of Columbia approves the plan, as required by the voting rights act, she will acquire some reliably Democrat voting precincts and shed others that lean Republican.

References

Sources

External links
Senator Janet Howell official website
Project Vote Smart - Senator Janet Denison Howell (VA) profile
Follow the Money - Janet D Howell
2005 2003 2001 1999 campaign contributions
Washington Post - Senate District 32 Race

1944 births
Living people
Oberlin College alumni
University of Pennsylvania alumni
People from Washington, D.C.
Democratic Party Virginia state senators
Women state legislators in Virginia
People from Reston, Virginia
American Unitarian Universalists
21st-century American politicians
21st-century American women politicians
20th-century American politicians
20th-century American women politicians